Mononychus is a genus of minute seed weevils in the family of beetles known as Curculionidae. There are at least 20 described species in Mononychus.

Species
These 25 species belong to the genus Mononychus:

 Mononychus algerinus Gandolphe, c
 Mononychus amurensis Schultze, 1898 c
 Mononychus angustus Schultze, 1899 c
 Mononychus caucasicus Kolen., 1859 c
 Mononychus euphraticus Schultze, 1897 c
 Mononychus interponens Schultze, 1901 c
 Mononychus interruptus Schultze, 1901 c
 Mononychus ireos (Pallas, P.S., 1773) c g
 Mononychus kolenatii Kolen., 1859 c
 Mononychus pallidicornis Pic, 1900 c
 Mononychus pseudacori Schoenherr, 1825 c
 Mononychus punctumalbum (Herbst, J.F.W., 1784) c g
 Mononychus quadrifossulatus Chevr., 1872 c
 Mononychus rondoui Vuillet, 1911 c
 Mononychus salviae Germar, 1824 c
 Mononychus schönherri Kolen., 1859 c
 Mononychus spermaticus Beck., 1862 c
 Mononychus sulcatocarinulatus Schultze, 1901 c
 Mononychus superciliaris Boheman, 1844 c
 Mononychus syriacus Redtenbacher, 1843 c
 Mononychus tangerianus Chevr., 1872 c
 Mononychus thompsoni Korotyaev, 1981 c
 Mononychus variegatus Brullé, 1838 c
 Mononychus vittatus Faldermann, 1835 c
 Mononychus vulpeculus (Fabricius, 1801) i c g b (iris weevil)

Data sources: i = ITIS, c = Catalogue of Life, g = GBIF, b = Bugguide.net

References

Further reading

External links

 

 	

Curculionidae